Paul Thomas Adam Shepstone (born 8 November 1970) is an English former professional footballer who played as a winger in the Football League for Blackburn Rovers and York City, in the Scottish Football League for Motherwell, in non-League football for Atherstone United, Stafford Rangers and Wycombe Wanderers, and was on the books of Coventry City and Birmingham City without making a league appearance. He earned one cap for the England national youth team in 1989.

References

1970 births
Living people
Footballers from Coventry
English footballers
England youth international footballers
Association football wingers
Coventry City F.C. players
Birmingham City F.C. players
Atherstone Town F.C. players
Blackburn Rovers F.C. players
York City F.C. players
Motherwell F.C. players
Stafford Rangers F.C. players
Wycombe Wanderers F.C. players
English Football League players
Scottish Football League players